Briton Ferry Athletic F.C. was a football club from Briton Ferry in Wales, playing their home games at Old Road. They last played in Welsh League Division Three. They merged with Llansawel to form Briton Ferry Llansawel A.F.C. on 28 April 2009.

History 
After being members of the Welsh League since the 1930s, in 1992 the club was one of the founder members of the League of Wales. After getting relegated in 1994, they bounced straight back as Welsh League Champions in 1994–95. They then spent another two years in Wales' top flight before being relegated again. The club dropped through the divisions to the point where in 2008 it was relegated to Division Three.

Honours 

League of Wales
Best ever finish Seventeenth in 1992–93 & 1995–96
Welsh League National Division (Step 1)
Runners-up 1991–92
Welsh League Division 1 (Step 2)
Winners 1971–72, 1994–95
Welsh League Division 2 West (Step 2)
Winners 1946–47
Welsh League Cup
Winners 2003–04
West Wales Senior Cup
Winners 2003–04, 2004–05
Runners-up 1947–48, 1974–75, 1983–84, 1986–87
Neath & District League Premier Division
Winners 1935–36, 1975–76
Runners-up 1972–73, 1973–74, 1983–84
Neath & District League Division One
Winners 1982–83, 1992–93
Runners-up 1994–95
Neath & District League Division Four
Runners-up 1985–86
Neath & District League Cup
Winners 1968–69, 1971–72, 1972–73, 1974–75, 1975–76
Neath & District League Premier Division Cup
Runners-up 1935–36, 1971–72, 1973–74
Neath & District League Division One Cup
Runners-up 1963–64

References 

 
1925 establishments in Wales
2009 disestablishments in Wales
Defunct football clubs in Wales
Association football clubs established in 1925
Association football clubs disestablished in 2009
Sport in Neath Port Talbot
Cymru Premier clubs
Neath & District League clubs
Welsh Football League clubs